|}

The Scurry Stakes is a Listed flat horse race in Great Britain open to horses aged three years.
It is run at Sandown Park over a distance of 5 furlongs and 10 yards (1,015 metres), and it is scheduled to take place each year in June.

The race was first run in 2005.

Records

Leading jockey (2 wins):
 William Buick - Burning Thread (2010), Lazuli (2020)
 Ryan Moore - Corrybrough (2008), Morawij (2013)
 Dane O'Neill - Waady (2015), Battaash (2017)
 Jamie Spencer – Hoh Mike (2007), Wind Fire (2014)

Leading trainer (2 wins):
 Michael Bell - Hoh Mike (2007), Margot Did (2011)
 Henry Candy – Corrybrough (2008), Kurious (2019)
 Roger Varian -  Morawij (2013), Mitbaahy (2022)

Winners

See also 
Horse racing in Great Britain
List of British flat horse races

References
Racing Post:

Flat horse races for three-year-olds
Sandown Park Racecourse
Flat races in Great Britain
Recurring sporting events established in 2005
2005 establishments in England